Events from the year 1861 in France.

Incumbents
 Monarch – Napoleon III

Events
News of Henri Mouhot's discovery of Angkor Wat is published.

Births
15 February - Charles Édouard Guillaume, physicist, awarded Nobel Prize in Physics in 1920 (died 1938)
21 February - Pierre de Bréville, composer (died 1949)
30 October - Antoine Bourdelle, sculptor (died 1929)
2 November - Maurice Blondel, philosopher (died 1949)
8 December
Aristide Maillol, sculptor (died 1944)
Georges Méliès, filmmaker (died 1938)
16 December - Antonio de La Gandara, painter and draughtsman (died 1917)

Full date unknown
Jacques Émile Blanche, painter (died 1942)

Deaths
5 February - Pierre Bosquet, Marshal of France (born 1810)
10 April - Édouard Ménétries, entomologist (born 1802)
14 July - Frédéric de Lafresnaye, ornithologist (born 1783)
24 August - Pierre Berthier, geologist and mining engineer (born 1782)
22 September - Rose Chéri, actress (born 1824)
10 November - Henri Mouhot, naturalist and explorer (born 1826)
10 November - Isidore Geoffroy Saint-Hilaire, zoologist (born 1805)
15 November - David Carcassonne, physician (born 1789)
20 November - Pierre Frédéric Sarrus, mathematician (born 1798)
21 November - Jean-Baptiste Henri Lacordaire, ecclesiastic, preacher, journalist and political activist (born 1802)

Full date unknown
Hippolyte André Jean Baptiste Chélard, composer, violinist and conductor (born 1789)
Marie-Alfred de Suin, French vice-admiral and commander (born 1796)

References

1860s in France